Rosanna Flamer-Caldera (born March 18, 1956) is a Sri Lankan LGBT rights activist. She lived in the US for over a decade and when she returned to Sri Lanka, she became the female Asian representative to ILGA and later its co-secretary general. She helped to found the Women's Support Group in 1999 and Equal Ground in 2004. She is also related to former Ford model and Wildlife and nature protection society Sri Lanka ambassador, Dr. Adam Flamer-Caldera.

Personal life and early activism 
Rosanna Flamer-Caldera was born in Sri Lanka on March 16, 1956, and is of partly Dutch descent. She grew up in Colombo, Sri Lanka. Flamer-Caldera describes in an interview with The Huffington Post that after coming out she moved from Sri Lanka to San Francisco at the age of 18 and that in 1978, she attended her first gay pride parade, which was led by Harvey Milk. When she returned to Sri Lanka, she used many of the tactics she had observed in San Francisco such as candlelight vigils and demonstrations.

Career and activism 
During her time in the United States, Flamer-Caldera worked first as a contact lens salesperson and then as a travel agent for twelve years. Flamer-Caldera then returned to Sri Lanka to spend more time with her parents. She entered into a partnership with a top golfer and started a pro golf shop.

As well as working for LGBTQI rights, she is also an environmental activist, running a kid's environment club and other events for protection of wildlife and jungles. In 2001, Flamer-Caldera became the female Asian representative to the executive board of ILGA (the International Lesbian and Gay Association, which is now the International Lesbian, Gay, Bisexual, Trans and Intersex Association). She was then elected co-secretary general in 2003 and was re-elected at the Geneva world conference in 2006.

Flamer-Caldera founded Equal Ground, an organization advocating for LGBTI rights in Sri Lanka in 2004. She was also a co-founder of the Sri Lankan LBT organization, the Women's Support Group, which was established in 1999 to provide support for lesbian, bisexual and transgender women. In addition she contributes as an NGO Advisor for Berlin based Hirschfeld Eddy Foundation and the Global Fund for Women.

Recognition 
In 2005, Flamer-Caldera received the Utopia Award for LGBT rights activism, which is Asia's leading LGBTI human rights award.
She was also voted the Toronto Pride’s International Grand Marshal for 2007 for her contribution to the promotion of global human rights.

References 

1956 births
Living people
Sri Lankan human rights activists
Sri Lankan LGBT people
Sri Lankan LGBT rights activists
Sri Lankan people of Dutch descent
American people of Sri Lankan descent